The Guadalcanal white-eye (Zosterops oblitus) is a species of bird in the family Zosteropidae. It is found on Guadalcanal. Its natural habitat is in subtropical or tropical moist montane forests. The Guadalcanal white-eye was formerly considered a subspecies of the grey-throated white-eye (Zosterops fuscicapilla).

References

Guadalcanal white-eye
Birds of Guadalcanal
Guadalcanal white-eye
Guadalcanal white-eye